Senator George may refer to:

Members of the United States Senate
James Z. George (1826–1897), U.S. Senator from Mississippi from 1881 to 1897
Walter F. George (1878–1957), U.S. Senator from Georgia from 1922 to 1957

United States state senate members
Gary George (Oregon politician), Oregon State Senate
Gary George (Wisconsin politician) (born 1954), Wisconsin State Senate
Larry George (born c. 1968), Oregon State Senate
Melvin Clark George (1849–1933), Oregon State Senate
Tom George (born 1956), Michigan State Senate